Georgetown High School is located in Georgetown, Massachusetts, United States. The school is part of the Georgetown Public School District.

Georgetown High School serves students grades 9 through 12. The school is the only high school in Georgetown. The middle school is located on the same property as the high school. The school colors are royal blue and white and the mascot is the Royal lancer.

Graduation requirements 
A total of 115 credits must be earned. Of this total, 80 credits must be earned in the following "Core Curriculum" areas:

Athletics 
Georgetown High School competes in the Cape Ann League, except in football, where they compete in the Commonwealth Athletic Conference, for smaller schools. Their biggest rival is Manchester Essex High School. Some sports teams co-op with other schools: the wrestling teams co-ops with Ipswich High School, track and swimming teams co-op with Triton Regional High School, girls Hockey co-ops with Masconomet Regional High School and boys Hockey and golf with Pentucket Regional High School.

The baseball team won its first Division IV State Championship in 2012 by defeating Harwich by a score of 11–1.

Clubs and activities 
The clubs and activities at Georgetown High School include:
 
 Chess Club
 Student Council
 Drama Club
 Peer Leaders
 Peer Mentors
 Key Club
 Tri-M (Music Honors Society)
 Yearbook Committee
 Co-ed and all-female A cappella clubs
 Northeast Regional Student Advisory Council
 National Honor Society
 DECA
 Dance Team
 Civil Rights Team
 SADD
 Jazz Band
 Quilting Club 
 National Art Honor Society
Anime Club
Arabic / Middle Eastern Club

References

External links 
 

Cape Ann League
Schools in Essex County, Massachusetts
Public high schools in Massachusetts
Georgetown, Massachusetts